Holly Shelter Swamp is a pocosin in southern coastal North Carolina near Jacksonville, in Pender County. Much of the swamp is included in the  Holly Shelter Game Land, administered by the North Carolina Wildlife Resources Commission. The Bear Garden tract of the northern swamp has been logged and has a road grid. The swamp is drained by the Northeast Cape Fear River.

References

Swamps of North Carolina
Protected areas of Pender County, North Carolina
Nature reserves in North Carolina
Landforms of Pender County, North Carolina
Pocosins